The Netherlands participated in the Junior Eurovision Song Contest 2020 which was held on 29 November 2020 in Warsaw, Poland. The girl group Unity was selected by AVROTROS to represent the country through the televised national selection Junior Songfestival 2020. They achieved 4th place with 132 points.

Background

In the  contest, Matheu represented the Netherlands in Gliwice, Poland with the song "Dans met jou". He placed 4th out of 19 entries with 186 points.

Before Junior Eurovision

Junior Songfestival 2020 
The national selection consisted of one live show, which was held on 26 September 2020. For the first time in its history, the contest was held in Rotterdam Ahoy and without an audience (due to the ongoing COVID-19 pandemic).

Competing entries 
The four acts that were planned to compete in the national final were announced on 29 May. However, before the show, it was announced that Robin and Unity member Demi had tested positive for COVID-19 on the day of the final. Therefore, Robin could not participate and Unity competed without their fourth member.

Final 
409,000 viewers watched the final live on NPO 3, the highest since 2017, with a market share of 3.7%.

Criticism 

With the release of T-Square's song "Count On Me", accusations of plagiarism of the song "Boy With Luv" by BTS emerged on social media. Due to these accusations, AVROTROS launched a formal investigation with several music experts. As a result of the investigation, AVROTROS responded to the allegations through the Junior Songfestival Instagram account rejecting the allegations, and that the K-Pop sound used in the song is common among international artists. They also said music should be a means to bring people together and not divide them, and that they firmly stand with T-Square regarding the song.

Artist and song information

Unity 

Unity is a Dutch girl group consisting of Naomi, Demi, Maud and Jayda. They represented the Netherlands in the Junior Eurovision Song Contest 2020 with the song "Best Friends".

Best Friends 
"Best Friends" is a song by Unity, written and produced by Robert Dorn. It was released on 16 July 2020, with an acoustic version being released on 6 November. The song contains verses in Dutch and a chorus in English.

At Junior Eurovision
After the opening ceremony, which took place on 23 November 2020, it was announced that the Netherlands would perform in third position in the final, following Kazakhstan and preceding Serbia. In total, 1,056,000 people watched the final live on 26 November 2020.

Voting 

During the live show, the Netherlands received 64 points from online voting, out of 697 total.

Detailed voting results
Every participating country had national jury that consisted of three music industry professionals and two kids aged between 10 and 15 who were citizens of the country they represented. The rankings of those jurors were combined to make an overall top ten. The results of the Dutch jury were announced during the liveshow by national finalist Robin de Haas.

References

Junior Eurovision Song Contest
Netherlands
2020